Sally Louise Preston  (born 1964) is a British entrepreneur and founder of the frozen babyfood company Babylicious. She is an advisor of the Conservative Party (UK) as a member of the New Enterprise Council.

Early career
Preston gained a degree in Food science and then joined Marks & Spencer’s ready-meals department in the 1980s. She left in 1999 to do consultancy work, partly motivated by the need to find a better balance between her working life and motherhood.

Babylicious
Preston founded Babylicious in 2001, partly because she had seen a need for high quality frozen baby food, and partly because, being newly divorced and diagnosed with skin cancer, she felt that "life’s pretty bad as it is already, what have I got to lose?"

The early years of Babylicious were notable for a series of problems, including theft of the company's name and consequent litigation, and a vendetta campaign staged by an ill-wisher who impersonated an official to make derogatory calls to Preston's customers. However her company today has a turnover of £2.5M p.a. and the value of the brand is estimated at £4M.

Preston was appointed Member of the Order of the British Empire (MBE) in the 2020 New Year Honours for services to entrepreneurship.

References

External links
 babylicious.co.uk

1964 births
Living people
British businesspeople
Members of the Order of the British Empire